An Earth ellipsoid or Earth spheroid is a mathematical figure approximating the  Earth's form, used as a reference frame for computations in geodesy, astronomy, and the geosciences. Various different ellipsoids have been used as approximations.

It is a spheroid (an ellipsoid of revolution) whose minor axis (shorter diameter), which connects the geographical North Pole and South Pole, is approximately aligned with the Earth's axis of rotation. The ellipsoid is defined by the equatorial axis (a) and the polar axis (b); their radial difference is slightly more than 21 km, or 0.335% of a (which is not quite 6,400 km).

Many methods exist for determination of the axes of an Earth ellipsoid, ranging from meridian arcs up to modern satellite geodesy or the analysis and interconnection of continental geodetic networks. Amongst the different set of data used in national surveys are several of special importance: the Bessel ellipsoid of 1841, the international Hayford ellipsoid of 1924, and (for GPS positioning) the WGS84 ellipsoid.

Types 
There are two types of ellipsoid: mean and reference.

A data set which describes the global average of the Earth's surface curvature is called the mean Earth Ellipsoid. It refers to a theoretical coherence between the geographic latitude and the meridional curvature of the geoid. The latter is close to the mean sea level, and therefore an ideal Earth ellipsoid has the same volume as the geoid.

While the mean Earth ellipsoid is the ideal basis of global geodesy, for regional networks a so-called reference ellipsoid may be the better choice. When geodetic measurements have to be computed on a mathematical reference surface, this surface should have a similar curvature as the regional geoid; otherwise, reduction of the measurements will get small distortions.

This is the reason for the "long life" of former reference ellipsoids like the Hayford or the Bessel ellipsoid, despite the fact that their main axes deviate by several hundred meters from the modern values. Another reason is a judicial one: the coordinates of millions of boundary stones should remain fixed for a long period. If their reference surface changes, the coordinates themselves also change.

However, for international networks, GPS positioning, or astronautics, these regional reasons are less relevant. As knowledge of the Earth's figure is increasingly accurate, the International Geoscientific Union IUGG usually adapts the axes of the Earth ellipsoid to the best available data.

Reference ellipsoid

In geodesy, a reference ellipsoid is a mathematically defined surface that approximates the geoid, which is the truer, imperfect figure of the Earth, or other planetary body, as opposed to a perfect, smooth, and unaltered sphere, which factors in the undulations of the bodies' gravity due to variations in the composition and density of the interior, as well as the subsequent flattening caused by the centrifugal force from the rotation of these massive objects (for planetary bodies that do rotate).
Because of their relative simplicity, reference ellipsoids are used as a preferred surface on which geodetic network computations are performed and point coordinates such as latitude, longitude, and elevation are defined.

In the context of standardization and geographic applications, a geodesic reference ellipsoid is the mathematical model used as foundation by spatial reference system or geodetic datum definitions.

Ellipsoid parameters 
In 1687 Isaac Newton published the Principia in which he included a proof that a rotating self-gravitating fluid body in equilibrium takes the form of a flattened ("oblate") ellipsoid of revolution, generated by an ellipse rotated around its minor diameter; a shape which he termed an oblate spheroid.

In geophysics, geodesy, and related areas, the word 'ellipsoid' is understood to mean 'oblate ellipsoid of revolution', and the older term 'oblate spheroid' is hardly used.  For bodies that cannot be well approximated by an ellipsoid of revolution a triaxial (or scalene) ellipsoid is used. 

The shape of an ellipsoid of revolution is determined by the shape parameters of that ellipse. The semi-major axis of the ellipse, becomes the equatorial radius of the ellipsoid: the semi-minor axis of the ellipse, becomes the distance from the centre to either pole. These two lengths completely specify the shape of the ellipsoid.

In geodesy publications, however, it is common to specify the semi-major axis (equatorial radius)  and the flattening , defined as:

That is,  is the amount of flattening at each pole, relative to the radius at the equator. This is often expressed as a fraction 1/;  then being the "inverse flattening".

Starting in the late twentieth century, improved measurements of satellite orbits and star positions have provided extremely accurate determinations of the earth's center of mass and of its axis of revolution; and those parameters have been adopted also for all modern reference ellipsoids.

Determination
Arc measurement is the historical method of determining the ellipsoid.
Two meridian arc measurements will allow the derivation of two parameters required to specify a reference ellipsoid. 
For example, if the measurements were hypothetically performed exactly over the equator plane and either geographical pole, the radii of curvature so obtained would be related to the equatorial radius and the polar radius, respectively a and b (see: Earth polar and equatorial radius of curvature). Then, the flattening would readily follow from its definition:
.

The theoretical Earth's meridional radius of curvature  can be calculated at the latitude of each arc measurement as:

where .
Finally, corrections for the initial equatorial radius  and the flattening  can be solved by means of a system of linear equations formulated via linearization of :

where the partial derivatives are:

Longer arcs with multiple intermediate-latitude determinations can completely determine the ellipsoid that best fits the surveyed region. In practice, multiple arc measurements are used to determine the ellipsoid parameters by the method of least squares adjustment. The parameters determined are usually the semi-major axis, and any of the semi-minor axis, flattening, or eccentricity.

Regional-scale systematic effects observed in the radius of curvature measurements reflect the geoid undulation and the deflection of the vertical, as explored in astrogeodetic leveling.

Gravimetry is another technique for determining Earth's flattening, as per Clairaut's theorem.

Modern geodesy no longer uses simple meridian arcs or ground triangulation networks, but the methods of satellite geodesy, especially satellite gravimetry.

Geodetic coordinates

Historical Earth ellipsoids 

The reference ellipsoid models listed below have had utility in geodetic work and many are still in use. The older ellipsoids are named for the individual who derived them and the year of development is given. In 1887 the English surveyor Colonel Alexander Ross Clarke CB FRS RE was awarded the Gold Medal of the Royal Society for his work in determining the figure of the Earth. The international ellipsoid was developed by John Fillmore Hayford in 1910 and adopted by the International Union of Geodesy and Geophysics (IUGG) in 1924, which recommended it for international use.

At the 1967 meeting of the IUGG held in Lucerne, Switzerland, the ellipsoid called GRS-67 (Geodetic Reference System 1967) in the listing was recommended for adoption.  The new ellipsoid was not recommended to replace the International Ellipsoid (1924), but was advocated for use where a greater degree of accuracy is required. It became a part of the GRS-67 which was approved and adopted at the 1971 meeting of the IUGG held in Moscow. It is used in Australia for the Australian Geodetic Datum and in the South American Datum 1969.

The GRS-80 (Geodetic Reference System 1980) as approved and adopted by the IUGG at its Canberra, Australia meeting of 1979 is based on the equatorial radius (semi-major axis of Earth ellipsoid) , total mass , dynamic form factor  and angular velocity of rotation , making the inverse flattening  a derived quantity.

An ellipsoidal model describes only the ellipsoid's geometry and a normal gravity field formula to go with it. Commonly an ellipsoidal model is part of a more encompassing geodetic datum. For example, the older ED-50 (European Datum 1950) is based on the Hayford or International Ellipsoid. WGS-84 is peculiar in that the same name is used for both the complete geodetic reference system and its component ellipsoidal model. Nevertheless, the two concepts—ellipsoidal model and geodetic reference system—remain distinct.

Note that the same ellipsoid may be known by different names. It is best to mention the defining constants for unambiguous identification.

See also 
 Equatorial bulge
 Earth radius of curvature
 Geodetic datum
 Great ellipse
 Meridian arc
 Normal gravity
 Planetary coordinate system
 History of geodesy
 Planetary ellipsoid

References

Bibliography
 P. K. Seidelmann (Chair), et al. (2005), “Report Of The IAU/IAG Working Group On Cartographic Coordinates And Rotational Elements: 2003,” Celestial Mechanics and Dynamical Astronomy, 91, pp. 203–215.
Web address: https://astrogeology.usgs.gov/Projects/WGCCRE
 OpenGIS Implementation Specification for Geographic information - Simple feature access - Part 1: Common architecture, Annex B.4. 2005-11-30
Web address: http://www.opengeospatial.org

External links 
Geographic coordinate system
Coordinate systems and transformations (SPENVIS help page)
Coordinate Systems, Frames and Datums

Geodesy
Earth sciences